Siege of Herat may refer to:

 Siege of Herat (652), part of the Islamic conquest of Sassanid Persia
 Siege of Herat (1448)
 Herat campaign of 1731
 Siege of Herat (1837–1838), an action by Qajar Persia that preceded the Anglo-Persian War
 Siege of Herat (1856)

See also
 Herat attack (disambiguation) 
 Herat, Afghanistan